Jaime Ramón Molina Mata (born 15 March 1969) is a Spanish retired footballer who played as a defender, and is a manager, currently in charge of St Joseph's.

He amassed Segunda División totals of 296 games and five goals over the course of 11 seasons, representing mainly Málaga, Mérida and Numancia (three years apiece). He added 123 matches and three goals in La Liga, where he also appeared for the first and third clubs.

Molina became a manager in 2006, working always in the lower leagues.

Playing career
Born in Estepona, Málaga, Andalusia, Molina graduated from CD Málaga's youth setup. He made his senior debut with the reserves in 1986, aged only 17.

On 10 January 1988, Molina appeared in his first game as a professional, starting in a 3–1 home win against Deportivo de La Coruña. He finished the season with six appearances, as his team was promoted to La Liga.

Molina was promoted to the main squad in 1989, and made his debut in the Spanish top level on 2 October 1988 by starting in a 1–1 draw at Sevilla FC. He featured regularly during the following campaigns, leaving the club in 1992 after it folded.

Molina subsequently alternated between the first and second divisions, representing CA Marbella, CP Mérida (two stints), RCD Espanyol, UD Las Palmas and CD Numancia. He retired with the latter side at the end of 2004–05 at the age of 36, having appeared in 22 matches and scored once in a relegation-ending season.

Coaching career
Molina started his managerial career shortly after retiring, taking charge of Mérida UD. He left in 2007, and was appointed at UD Los Barrios in the summer of 2008.

On 5 July 2011, after a stint at CF Villanovense, Molina was named Atlético Malagueño coach. In July of the following year he moved to Unión Estepona CF, and signed as head coach of Marbella FC on 3 May 2013.

References

External links

1969 births
Living people
People from Estepona
Sportspeople from the Province of Málaga
Spanish footballers
Footballers from Andalusia
Association football defenders
La Liga players
Segunda División players
Tercera División players
Málaga CF players
CD Málaga footballers
CA Marbella footballers
CP Mérida footballers
RCD Espanyol footballers
UD Las Palmas players
CD Numancia players
Spanish football managers
Segunda División B managers
Mérida UD managers
CF Villanovense managers
Marbella FC managers
Spanish expatriate football managers
Expatriate football managers in Gibraltar
Shanghai Shenhua F.C. non-playing staff
Gibraltar National League managers